Columbus State Hospital, also known as Ohio State Hospital for Insane, was a public psychiatric hospital in Columbus, Ohio, founded in 1838 and rebuilt in 1877. The hospital was constructed under the Kirkbride Plan.

The building was said to have been the largest in the U.S. or the world, until the Pentagon was completed in 1943.

History
The original hospital building, known as the Lunatic Asylum of Ohio, was completed in 1838. In 1868, a fire destroyed the asylum, and it was rebuilt in the Kirkbride style in 1877. The hospital was closed in the late 1980s, and was listed on the National Register of Historic Places in an attempt to save the building in 1986. The structure was nevertheless demolished between 1991 and 1996 by S.G. Loewendick & Sons.

See also
 National Register of Historic Places listings in Columbus, Ohio

References

Further reading

External links
 

1838 establishments in Ohio
1877 establishments in Ohio
Defunct hospitals in Ohio
Kirkbride Plan hospitals
Hospitals established in 1838
Demolished buildings and structures in Columbus, Ohio
Hospitals in Columbus, Ohio
Hospital buildings completed in 1838
Hospital buildings completed in 1877
Psychiatric hospitals in Ohio
Broad Street (Columbus, Ohio)